The 1992–93 Divizia A was the seventy-fifth season of Divizia A, the top-level football league of Romania.

Teams

League table
The country obtained a third place for the UEFA Cup following the UN ban of Yugoslavia.

Results

Top goalscorers

Champion squad

References

Liga I seasons
Romania
1992–93 in Romanian football